This is a list of countries by meat consumption. Meat is animal flesh that is eaten as food.

Accuracy
The figures tabulated below do not represent per capita amounts of meat eaten by humans. Instead, they represent FAO figures for carcass mass availability (with "carcass mass" for poultry estimated as ready-to-cook mass), divided by population. The amount eaten by humans differs from carcass mass availability because the latter does not account for losses, which include bones, losses in retail and food service or home preparation  (including trim and cooking), spoilage and "downstream" waste, and amounts consumed by pets (compare dressed weight). Additionally, the 2002 FAO study was potentially misleading for countries with high levels of meat export compared to their population, as it relied on production data using full carcass mass availability, whereas exports generally contain less bones, cartilage and other things not typically used for human consumption. More recent FAO figures (2009) have taken the earlier discrepancy into account, resulting in a significantly lower  for Denmark (13th in the world).

Meat consumption by country

Source: Food and Agriculture Organization of the United Nations (FAO), FAOSTAT on-line statistical service (FAO, Rome, 2004). Available online at: http://faostat3.fao.org/ 
 Meat consumption per capita refers to the total meat retained for use in country per person per year. Total meat includes meat from animals slaughtered in countries, irrespective of their origin, and comprises horsemeat, poultry, and meat from all other domestic or wild animals such as camels, rabbits, reindeer, and game animals
 Per capita (person) calculations were conducted by WRI using FAO data on meat production and trade, and using U.N. data on population. Meat consumption was calculated using a trade balance approach - total production plus imports, minus exports.

See also 

 Vegetarianism by country

Notes

References

External links

Meat
Meat industry
meat consumption